The Kona Hawaii Temple is the 70th operating temple of the Church of Jesus Christ of Latter-day Saints (LDS Church). The temple is located in Kailua-Kona on the island of Hawaii and is the second temple built in Hawaii, along with the Laie Hawaii Temple. It is the sixth temple built in the Pacific Islands.

History
The Kona Hawaii Temple was announced May 7, 1998, with a groundbreaking ceremony presided over by John B. Dickson of the Seventy held less than a year later on March 13, 1999. Approximately 1,200 people attended the groundbreaking ceremonies. Dickson, Donald L. Hallstrom, an area seventy, Hilo stake president John Sakamaki and Kona stake president Philip A. Harris each spoke at the ceremony. Dickson turned over the first shovelful of dirt, after which other onlookers, including many children, also participated.

The structure itself was constructed in concrete, white marble and some native materials. Architects used a simple classical design featuring a single spire, similar to other smaller temples constructed by the church at the same time.

Upon completion, an open house was held from January 12–15, 2000. LDS Church president Gordon B. Hinckley dedicated the Kona Hawaii Temple on January 23–24, 2000. Hinckley was accompanied to the dedication by Boyd K. Packer, Acting President of the Quorum of the Twelve Apostles, and Hallstrom. More than 3,800 church members attended the dedicatory sessions.

In 2020, the Kona Hawaii Temple was closed in response to the coronavirus pandemic.

Temple facts
The Kona Hawaii Temple has two ordinance rooms and two sealing rooms.

The temple dedication was considered the first event in a yearlong commemoration of the sesquicentennial of the church in Hawaii.

NFL Hall of Fame quarterback Steve Young married his wife, Barbara Graham, in the Kona Hawaii Temple on March 15, 2000.

See also

 Comparison of temples of The Church of Jesus Christ of Latter-day Saints
 List of temples of The Church of Jesus Christ of Latter-day Saints
 List of temples of The Church of Jesus Christ of Latter-day Saints by geographic region
 Temple architecture (Latter-day Saints)
 The Church of Jesus Christ of Latter-day Saints in Hawaii

References

Additional reading

External links
Kona Hawaii Temple Official site
Kona Hawaii Temple at ChurchofJesusChristTemples.org

20th-century Latter Day Saint temples
Hawaiian architecture
Religious buildings and structures in Hawaii
Religious buildings and structures in Hawaii County, Hawaii
Temples (LDS Church) completed in 2000
Temples (LDS Church) in Oceania
Temples (LDS Church) in the United States
The Church of Jesus Christ of Latter-day Saints in Hawaii
2000 establishments in Hawaii